King Biscuit Flower Hour Presents Kansas is the third live album from American rock band Kansas, released in 1998 (see 1998 in music). In 2003, the album was re-titled and re-released as Greatest Hits Live (see below). It was also released in the DVD-Audio format as From the Front Row Live, but the 5.1 mix for this series was not of particularly high quality. The original performance included 2 tracks not included in this release: "Play the Game Tonight" and a cover of "Born to Be Wild." The liner notes include an extensive essay describing this era of the band and the circumstances surrounding the album and tour supporting it during which this show was recorded.

Featuring performances by Steve Walsh and Steve Morse, the album was recorded on February 14, 1989 at the Tower Theater in Philadelphia, Pennsylvania during their In the Spirit of Things tour.

In 2001, the same concert was released on the album Dust in the Wind by Disky Communications Europe, but with the tracks in a different order.

Track listings
King Biscuit Flower Hour Presents Kansas
"Magnum Opus" (Kerry Livgren, Steve Walsh, Rich Williams, Dave Hope, Phil Ehart, Robby Steinhardt) – 2:12
"One Big Sky" (Howard Kleinfeld, Michael Dan Ehmig, Ehart, Walsh, Bob Ezrin) – 6:11
"Paradox" (Livgren, Walsh) – 4:11
"Point of Know Return" (Walsh, Ehart, Steinhardt) – 5:16
"The Wall" (Livgren, Walsh) – 6:04
"All I Wanted" (Walsh, Steve Morse) – 5:29
"T.O. Witcher" (Morse, Walsh) – 1:42
"Dust in the Wind" (Livgren) – 4:27
"Miracles Out of Nowhere" (Livgren) – 6:47
"The Preacher" (Walsh, Morse) – 4:57
"House on Fire" (Walsh, Morse, Ezrin, Ehart) – 12:12
"Carry On Wayward Son" (Livgren) – 6:26

Dust in the Wind
"Miracles Out of Nowhere" – 6:47
"Paradox" – 4:11
"One Big Sky" – 6:06
"T.O. Witcher" – 1:37
"Dust in the Wind" – 4:24
"The Preacher" – 4:57
"Point of Know Return" – 5:03
"House on Fire" – 12:05
"Carry On Wayward Son" – 6:20
"All I Wanted" – 4:53
"Magnum Opus" – 2:12
"The Wall" – 5:43

Personnel
Kansas
Steve Walsh - vocals, keyboards
Steve Morse - guitar
Rich Williams - guitar
Greg Robert - additional keyboards
Billy Greer - bass
Phil Ehart - drums

Production
Kevin T. Cain, Steven Ship - executive producers
Tom Volpicelli - engineer
Joe Mattis - mixing
Dixon Van Winkle - mastering

References

Kansas (band) live albums
1998 live albums